Tint Swe (born 9 August 1948) is a Burmese physician and politician who was elected MP for Pyithu Hluttaw in the 1990 election. He has served as Minister for Prime Minister's Office of National Coalition Government of the Union of Burma (NCGUB). He also served as the Minister for Information in office from 23 January 2009 to 14 September 2012, and chairperson of the National League for Democracy-Liberated Area (India).

Early life and education
Tint Swe was born on 9 August 1948 in Minywa village, Pale, Myanmar to Ba Cho and Khin Khin. He graduated high school from State High School No. 2 in Monywa. He graduated from the Institute of Medicine, Mandalay with medical degree (MBBS) in 1972, and spent 15 years practicing as a medical officer in Monywa, Ngazun, Sagaing, Pale. In 1970, he married Mya Mya Aye, and he resigned from  government service in 1988.

Career
Tint Swe joined the National League for Democracy in 1988, after the 8888 Uprising. In the 1990 elections, he was elected as the Pyithu Hluttaw MP for Constituency No. 2 of Pale Township, Sagaing Division winning a majority of 33,195 (61.08% of the votes), but was not allowed to assume his seat. He was among the elected MPs who worked clandestinely to form the National Coalition Government of the Union of Burma.

In October 1990, he escaped from arrest and fled to India. Tint Swe joined the NCGUB and served as senior representative from 1991 to 1995. Then, he became a Sein Win's cabinet minister for NCGUB. He also served as Minister for Prime Minister's Office (West) and Minister for Health and Education. On 14 September 2012, NCGUB was officially dissolved and he retired from NCGUB.

He had served as the chairman of Burma Centre Delhi (BCD). He then founded the Yamuna Clinic in 2002, a project to offer free primary medical health care to Burmese refugees in Delhi. He lived in India for many years and pursued with the Indian media and civil society for supporting the pro-democracy movement in Myanmar. He arrived in India on 21 December 1990 and left for the USA on 18 September 2014. Now, he resides in Indianapolis, Indiana, United States.

He visited Burma for the first time after  years in May 2018. He stayed there for 7 weeks in Burma and returned to Indianapolis on 19 June 2018.

References

Government ministers of Myanmar
National League for Democracy politicians
Members of Pyithu Hluttaw
1948 births
Living people
20th-century Burmese physicians
People from Sagaing Region